Max Mellin (1904–1977) was a German art director.

Selected filmography
 Happy Days in Aranjuez (1933)
 The Girlfriend of a Big Man (1934)
 Playing with Fire (1934)
 Marriage Strike (1935)
 Fresh Wind from Canada (1935)
 Winter in the Woods (1936)
Lady Killer (1937)
 Kitty and the World Conference (1939)
 The Governor (1939)
 Counterfeiters (1940)
 Music in Salzburg (1944)
 Hello, Fraulein! (1949)
 The Blue Straw Hat (1949)
 Everything for the Company (1950)
 Love on Ice (1950)
 Love and Blood (1951)
 The Lady in Black (1951)
 Captive Soul (1952)
 Towers of Silence (1952)
 The Imaginary Invalid (1952)
 Roses Bloom on the Moorland (1952)
 The Last Waltz (1953)
 The Angel with the Flaming Sword (1954)
 The Sinful Village (1954)
 Request Concert (1955)
 Lost Child 312 (1955)
 Doctor Bertram (1957)
 Do Not Send Your Wife to Italy (1960)
 Isola Bella (1961)
 I Must Go to the City (1962)
 Red Dragon (1965)

References

Bibliography
 Kay Weniger: Das große Personenlexikon des Films. Die Schauspieler, Regisseure, Kameraleute, Produzenten, Komponisten, Drehbuchautoren, Filmarchitekten, Ausstatter, Kostümbildner, Cutter, Tontechniker, Maskenbildner und Special Effects Designer des 20. Jahrhunderts. Vol. 5: L – N. Rudolf Lettinger – Lloyd Nolan. Schwarzkopf & Schwarzkopf, Berlin 2001, p. 385.
 Wolfgang Jacobsen & Hans Helmut Prinzler. Käutner. Spiess, 1992.

External links

1904 births
1977 deaths
German art directors
Film people from Berlin